Joker 2 refers to Joker: Folie à Deux, the sequel to the 2019 film Joker.

It may also refer to:

 Joker 2.0, a version of the DC Comics character "Joker"
 Dragon Quest Monsters: Joker 2, a 2011 videogame
 Joker II, a 1991 videogame by Birdy Soft; see List of X68000 games and List of PC-98 games
 FC Joker II, a soccer team in Raasiku, Estonia; see List of active football clubs in Estonia

See also 
 Joker (disambiguation)